Municipal elections in Estonia were held in October 2021, with advance voting starting on 11 October, and election day on 17 October.

Results

By municipality

Polling

Tallinn

References

External links
Estonian National Electoral Committee

Estonia
Municipal
Local elections in Estonia